Shamoon Ismail (Urdu) is a Pakistani singer, songwriter, composer and multi-instrumentalist known for his signature blend of "Punjabi and blues".

Early life 

Shamoon Ismail was born and raised in Islamabad, Pakistan. He has spent most of his life in Pakistan learning musical instruments, having a keen interest in playing guitars since childhood.

Out of the four instruments he can play, he prefers the guitar and bass the most while also enjoying drums.

Career 

At the beginning of his career, Ismail first started releasing music on Bandcamp and SoundCloud with the help of his friends, from where he attracted a following. He often performs live on local university campuses and also in popular regional music festivals like Music Mela and Lahore Music Meet. He released his first music video "Tuntuna" on YouTube which was popular among Pakistani and Indian audiences. His collaborations with other artists include MRKLE, Talal Qureshi, Abdullah Qureshi, Haider Mustehsan, Mooroo, Ghauri, Young Stunners, Asim Azhar, Raamis, Annural Khalid, Talha Anjum and Talhah Yunas.

In late 2018, Pakistani singer Bilal Khan was accused of plagiarizing Shamoon Ismail's "Taare".

Awards and nominations 

! Ref
|-
! style="background:#bfd7ff" colspan="5"|Lux Style Awards
|-
| 2019
| Marijuana
| Singer of the Year
| 
|
|-
! style="background:#bfd7ff" colspan="5"|Lux Style Awards
|-
| 2020
| Late Night
| Song of the Year
| 
|
|-
! style="background:#bfd7ff" colspan="5"|Shaan-e-Pakistan Music Achievements Awards (SEPMA)
|-
| 2020
| Rok Le
| Best Indie Music
| 
|
|-
! style="background:#bfd7ff" colspan="5"|Hum Style Awards
|-
| 2021
| colspan="2"|Most Stylish Performer
| 
|
|-
! style="background:#bfd7ff" colspan="5"|Pakistan International Screen Awards (PISA)
|-
| 2021
| On & On
| Song of the Year
| 
|
|}

Discography

References 

Pakistani male singers
Punjabi people
Punjabi singers
Living people
1991 births
Pakistani multi-instrumentalists